This is a list of films produced or distributed by Castle Rock Entertainment.

1980s–1990s

2000s

2010s

Upcoming films 
 This is Spinal Tap II
 Albert Brooks: Defending My Life
 Daughter of the Bride
 Pure
 Wind River: The Next Chapter

Television shows 
 Heart & Soul (1988)
 Seinfeld (1989–1998) (with Giggling Goose Productions, West/Shapiro Productions, Fred Barron Productions and Sony Pictures Television)
 The Ed Begley, Jr. Show (1989)
 Julie Brown: The Show (1989)
 Homeroom (1989)
 Ann Jillian (1989-1990)
 New Attitude (1990)
 Partners in Life (1990)
 Morton & Hayes (1991)
 My Old School (1991)
 Sessions (1991) (co-production with HBO)
 Please Watch the Jon Lovitz Special (1992)
 The Powers That Be (1992) (with ELP Communications and Columbia Pictures Television)
 Great Scott! (1992) (co-production with Claverly One Productions)
 Thea (1993–1994)
 The Second Half (1993–1994)
 704 Hauser (1994, pilot only)
 The Single Guy (1995–1997) (with Hall of Production (Season 1) and NBC Productions)
 The Lazarus Man (1996)
 Boston Common (1996-1997) (with KoMut Entertainment and Columbia TriStar Television)
 Reunited (1998)
 The Army Show (1998)
 Mission Hill (1999–2002) (with Film Roman, Bill Oakley/Josh Weinstein Productions and Warner Bros. Television)
 Movie Stars (1999)
 The Michael Richards Show (2000–2001)
 Zero Effect (2001, pilot) (with Warner Bros. Television)

References 

Castle Rock
Castle Rock Entertainment films